Bhaktapur Cancer Hospital is a cancer hospital located in Bhaktapur, Bagmati Province, Nepal, run by the Government of Nepal. The hospital currently has 150 beds and  specializes in cancer treatment, study and research.

Objectives 
The objectives of this hospital are
To establish the hospital as a tertiary referral center.
To provide palliative care services, pain management and cancer support programs.
To introduce computer based hospital management information system.
To provide charity services to poor and needy people.
To conduct cancer registry and telemedicine.
To play role in the training of manpower.
To do academic and research work in cancer.

References

Hospital buildings completed in 1992
Hospitals in Nepal
Buildings and structures in Bhaktapur District
Cancer organisations based in Nepal
1992 establishments in Nepal